Hallaxa cryptica is a species of sea slug or dorid nudibranch, a marine gastropod mollusk in the family Actinocyclidae.

Distribution

Description

Ecology

References

Actinocyclidae
Gastropods described in 1994